Colasposoma iturianum is a species of leaf beetle in the genus Colasposoma, described by Julius Weise in 1912 in the Democratic Republic of the Congo.

References

iturianum
Beetles of the Democratic Republic of the Congo
Taxa named by Julius Weise
Beetles described in 1912
Endemic fauna of the Democratic Republic of the Congo